The Visionists were an informal social club based in Boston, Massachusetts in the late 19th century, focused on the members' shared interests in artists, writers, and cultural movements.  Documented members included:
 Writer/architect Ralph Adams Cram
 Publisher/photographer F. Holland Day
 Designer/architect Bertram Grosvenor Goodhue
 Poet Bliss Carman
 Poet Richard Hovey
 Musician/composer Frederic Field Bullard
 Editor/Publisher/Entrepreneur Herbert Small (co-founder of the world's first public relations firm)
 Publisher Herbert Copeland
 Publisher/photographer Francis Watts Lee
 Illustrator/painter Thomas Buford Meteyard
 Playwright/actor John C. "Jack" Abbott
 Writer Jonathan Thayer Lincoln

Poet Louise Imogen Guiney and writer Alice Brown were close with this group and participated in at least some of their gatherings.  Their extended circle of friends also included illustrator Ethel Reed, art historian Bernard Berenson, and poet Gelett Burgess.

According to Cram's autobiography, the Visionists were a "social-controversial-inspiration group" that never numbered more than twenty, made up of the "madder and more fantastic members" of a similar but larger group called "The Pewter Mugs".  They held periodic meetings in their "hideout" on Boston's Province Court, as well as gatherings in suburban locations such as Day's house in Norwood, Massachusetts or a house shared by Thomas Buford Meteyard and his mother in Scituate, Massachusetts.

The members' shared interests included medieval art and architecture, Aestheticism, the Decadent movement, Christian socialism, the Arts and Crafts movement, the Pre-Raphaelites, and Theosophy.  Favorite writers and artists included Oscar Wilde, William Morris, John Ruskin, and Dante Gabriel Rossetti.  From 1892 to 1893 the group edited a literary journal titled The Knight Errant, published by Francis Watts Lee.

References

External links 
 The Knight Errant on JSTOR
 Short documentary about the Visionists

Clubs and societies in Boston